"How to Be Dead" is the fourth (fifth if the re-issue of "Spitting Games" is counted) and final single by Snow Patrol from their album Final Straw. It was released in 2004, slightly remixed by Chris Lord-Alge from the album version, and reached number 39 in the United Kingdom and number 42 in Ireland.

The song is a downtempo rock ballad, with lyrics detailing a conversation between a couple.

Reception
Yahoo! Music's Jairne Gill reviewed the single positively, giving it 7 stars out of 10. Though he felt Snow Patrol usually made "ugly empty anthems", the single was a "rather lovely little song" and "modest" and "chimingly melodic". Gill praised the lyrics of the song, calling it "a pretty little knife which Gary Lightbody seems to be twisting into his own chest, a list of druggy regrets and lost loves" and also said that, though the song's "gentle, skipping rhythm threatens to go BIG", it doesn't and "a pretty and intimate song is preserved".

Track listings
CD
 "How to Be Dead" (Chris Lord-Alge Mix) – 3:23
 "You Are My Joy" (Live at Somerset House) – 3:20
 "Chocolate" (Grand National Mix) – 4:58

Germany 3" CD
 "How to Be Dead" (Chris Lord-Alge Mix) – 3:23
 "You Are My Joy" (Live at Somerset House) – 3:20

7"
 "How to Be Dead" (Chris Lord-Alge Mix) – 3:23
 "You Are My Joy" (Live at Somerset House) – 3:20

Promo CD
 "How to Be Dead" (Chris Lord-Alge Edited Mix) – 3:12

Charts

In popular culture
"How to Be Dead" was featured on the soundtracks to American Pie: Band Camp and Wicker Park.

References

External links
 

2000s ballads
2003 singles
Rock ballads
Snow Patrol songs
Song recordings produced by Jacknife Lee
Songs written by Gary Lightbody
Songs written by Nathan Connolly
Songs written by Jonny Quinn
Songs written by Mark McClelland
2003 songs
Fiction Records singles
Interscope Records singles